High Hoyland is a village and civil parish in the Metropolitan Borough of Barnsley in South Yorkshire, England, on the border with West Yorkshire. At the 2001 census it had a population of 142, reducing to 128 at the 2011 Census.

There are many Hoylands in Barnsley - there is the village of Hoyland itself south east of Barnsley on the road to Sheffield, which includes the former hamlets of Hoyland Common, Upper Hoyland and Hoyland Nether (nether being old English for "lower").  Hoylandswaine is located on the opposite side of the wide valley, and at almost 1000 feet above sea level has a wilder and bleaker feel than High Hoyland.

The word Hoyland is derived from Norse, and at its simplest means "farm on a hill". Despite there being countless farms on hills around England, the majority of the Hoylands are concentrated in Barnsley.

History
There is some evidence to suggest that High Hoyland has quite an ancient history, though no archaeological survey has yet taken place.  Some people believe the village may have been the site of an Iron Age hill fort, and its strategic hilltop location would surely have been a good place for one.  Nearby Kexbrough (originally Cezeburgh) also lends weight to the theory, since the "burghs" were originally strongholds.

The village was nevertheless in existence in 1086 when the Domesday survey was compiled.  The village was listed as Heyholand, being one of only 16 settlements in present-day South Yorkshire to be recorded.

Today a bridleway runs along the ridge above the village; originally this was a trans-Pennine salt track, and was also mentioned in the Domesday survey.

Present day
The village is now part of Barnsley's metropolitan area, yet retains a very rural feel and has become part of the commuter belt west of Barnsley, which also includes Silkstone and Cawthorne.  The Cherry Tree Public House is one of the most famous in South Yorkshire, and has won awards for both its ale and its views - with spectacular open vistas across the valley.  From here it is possible to see Cannon Hall, the Peak District National Park, Barnsley Town Hall and on clear days the cooling towers of the distant power stations of Drax and Eggborough.

See also
Listed buildings in High Hoyland

References

External links

Villages in South Yorkshire
Geography of the Metropolitan Borough of Barnsley
Civil parishes in South Yorkshire